Bangladesh Coast Guard currently operates 167 surface ships and craft. Most of them are small coastal patrol vessels. The coast guard ships use the prefix "CGS" before the name of the ships which stands for "Coast Guard  Ship".

Offshore patrol vessels

Inshore patrol vessels

Fast patrol vessels

Coastal patrol vessels

Riverine patrol craft

Harbour patrol boats

Small craft

Under construction

See also
 List of active ships of the Bangladesh Navy
 List of historic ships of the Bangladesh Navy
 Bangladesh Navy
 Bangladesh Army
 Bangladesh Air Force

References

Lists of military equipment
Ships of the Bangladesh Coast Guard